Colonel Patrick Anthony Porteous VC (1 January 1918 – 9 October 2000) was a Scottish recipient of the Victoria Cross, the highest and most prestigious award for gallantry in the face of the enemy that can be awarded to British and Commonwealth forces.

Second World War
Porteous was commissioned in the Royal Regiment of Artillery in 1937. On 26 August 1940 he was promoted to lieutenant.  On 19 August 1942, he was 24 years old and a temporary major attached to No. 4 Commando when he did the deed for which he was awarded the VC, during the Dieppe Raid.  The citation was published in a supplement to the London Gazette of 2 October 1942 and read:

Later career
In spite of severe wounds, Porteous went on to make a full recovery and had a distinguished military career in Palestine, Germany and Singapore.  Following the war he was confirmed in the rank of captain, promoted to major in 1950, lieutenant colonel on 1 May 1959, and rose to the rank of colonel before he retired in 1970. He had the honour of being in the leading car at the late Queen Mother's 100th Birthday Parade, before his death in October 2000, aged 82.

References

Further reading
British VCs of World War 2 (John Laffin, 1997)
Monuments to Courage (David Harvey, 1999)
The Register of the Victoria Cross (This England, 1997)

External links
Location of grave and VC medal (West Sussex)
Porteous Patrick Porteous
Imperial War Museum Interview

1918 births
2000 deaths
People educated at Wellington College, Berkshire
British Army personnel of World War II
Royal Artillery officers
British World War II recipients of the Victoria Cross
People from Abbottabad
British Army Commandos officers
British Army recipients of the Victoria Cross
British people in colonial India
Military personnel of British India